All Cheerleaders Die is a 2001 American low-budget horror film written and directed by Lucky McKee and Chris Sivertson. The film was released on January 27, 2001, and was later remade into a 2013 film by the same name. It stars Chris Heinrich, who served as second unit director of photography in the remake.

Of the film, the directors stated that they chose to eventually remake it because they wanted a "fresh start", as they had shot the 2001 video immediately after graduating from college.

Plot
A group of high school football players gets into an argument with their cheerleader girlfriends over the difficulty of their respective sports. The cheerleaders insist that  forming a human pyramid is difficult, while the players insist that their boot camp is more strenuous. As a result, the players decide to set up a camping weekend with the idea of putting the girls through football training. This turns out to be a bad idea, as one of the cheerleaders ends up beating one of the footballers in a scrimmage game, who then ends up severely beating her. The girls try to escape, only to fall off a cliff and die. Panicked, the players assume that the girls are either dead or dying, and run off in the hopes that nobody will discover what has happened. Unbeknownst to them, one of the girls has survived and later returns at a high-school reunion to seek revenge. She summons the zombified remains of her dead friends, and one by one, picks off the football players.

Cast
Julia Carpenter as Hanna Popkin
Drama as Tracey Beezley
Dirty Ernie as Bartender
Jennifer Grant as Martha Apple
Chris Heinrich as George Shank
Jesse Hlubik as Terry Stankus
Bonnie McKee as Marquita Fector
Mike McKee as Coach Wolf
Quincy McKee as Sammy Fector
Shelli Merrill as Leena Maho
Zach Passero as Vik Dario
Matthew Shebesta as Manchester Manny Mankiewitz
Marni Sparks as Simone Gavina
Melinda Sparks as Tasha Kindle
Eric Van Bebber as Ben Factor

Reception
Joe Bob Briggs gave the film two stars and summed it up as "Return of the Living Dead meets Cheerleader Camp meets Stoner".

References

External links

2001 films
American supernatural horror films
American horror thriller films
Films directed by Lucky McKee
Films directed by Chris Sivertson
2000s thriller films
2001 horror films
Films about witchcraft
2001 directorial debut films
Cheerleading films
2000s English-language films
2000s American films